Marienrachdorf is an Ortsgemeinde – a community belonging to a Verbandsgemeinde – in the Westerwaldkreis in Rhineland-Palatinate, Germany.

Geography

Marienrachdorf lies 4 km northwest of Selters. The community belongs to the Verbandsgemeinde of Selters, a kind of collective municipality.

History
In 1190, Marienrachdorf had its first documentary mention as Rachdorf. In 1972, in the course of municipal restructuring, the Verbandsgemeinde of Selters was founded, to which Marienrachdorf belongs.

Politics

The municipal council is made up of 12 council members, as well as the honorary and presiding mayor (Ortsbürgermeister), who were elected in a majority vote in a municipal election on 13 June 2004.
Apportionment of seats on Council:

Clubs
 Kirchenchor Cäcilia (church choir)
 Musikverein 1977 Marienrachdorf e.V. (music)
 Angelsportverein Marienrachdorf  (angling)
 Gymnastikverein (women's gymnastics)
 Sportverein Marienrachdorf e.V. 1921 (sport)
 Dartclub Florida

Economy and infrastructure

Northwest of the community runs Bundesstraße 413, leading from Bendorf to Hachenburg. The nearest Autobahn interchange is Dierdorf on the A 3 (Cologne–Frankfurt). The nearest InterCityExpress stop is the railway station at Montabaur on the Cologne-Frankfurt high-speed rail line.

References

External links
 Marienrachdorf 
 Verbandsgemeinde of Selters 

Municipalities in Rhineland-Palatinate
Westerwaldkreis